Mexico City Metro Line 6 is one of the twelve metro lines operating in Mexico City, Mexico. Its distinctive color is red. It was the sixth line to be opened.

The line was inaugurated in 1983 and it runs from northwest to northeastern Mexico City.

Line 6 is the second line in the entire Mexico City Metro network with least passengers, having 23,533,445 users in 2021.

History
Line 6 was opened on 21 December 1983, in the section that goes from El Rosario, serving the estate Unidad Habitacional El Rosario -the biggest estate in the country, to Instituto del Petróleo. The latter became the first transfer station when it was connected to the already existing station of Line 5.

Three years later, on 8 July 1986, the second stretch of the line was inaugurated: from Instituto del Petróleo to Martín Carrera, connecting with Line 4.

Chronology 

21 December 1983: from El Rosario to Instituto del Petróleo
8 July 1986: from Instituto del Petróleo to Martín Carrera

Rolling stock
Line 6 has had different types of rolling stock throughout the years.

Alstom MP-68: 1983–1994
Concarril NM-73: 1983–present
Concarril NM-79: 2015–present

As of 2020, out of the 390 trains in the Mexico City Metro network, 17 are in service in Line 6.

Station list

The stations from west to east: 
{| class="wikitable" rules="all"
|-
!rowspan="2" | No.
!rowspan="2" | Station
!rowspan="2" | Date opened
!rowspan="2" | Level
!colspan="2" | Distance (km)
!rowspan="2" | Connection
!rowspan="2" | Location
|-
!style="font-size: 65%;"|Betweenstations
!style="font-size: 65%;"|Total
|-
|style="background: #; color: white;"|01
|El Rosario 
| rowspan="7" |December 21, 1983
|Grade level, overground access
|style="text-align:right;"|-
|style="text-align:right;"|0.0
|
  Line 7
 El Rosario
  Line 6: El Rosario station
 Routes: 19, 19-A, 59, 59-A, 107
  Lines 4: El Rosario stop  Lines 6: El Rosario stop

|rowspan="6"|Azcapotzalco
|-
|style="background: #; color: white;"|02
|Tezozómoc
| rowspan="10" |Underground
|style="text-align:right;"|1.4
|style="text-align:right;"|1.4
|
|-
|style="background: #; color: white;"|03
|UAM-Azcapotzalco
|style="text-align:right;"|1.1
|style="text-align:right;"|2.5
|
 Routes: 59-A, 107, 107-B
|-
|style="background: #; color: white;"|04
|Ferrería/Arena Ciudad de México
|style="text-align:right;"|1.3
|style="text-align:right;"|3.8
|
 Routes: 19, 19-A, 107-B
  Line 1: Fortuna station
|-
|style="background: #; color: white;"|05
|Norte 45
|style="text-align:right;"|1.2
|style="text-align:right;"|5.0
|
  Line 6: Norte 45 station (at distance)
 Route: 15-A (at distance)
|-
|style="background: #; color: white;"|06
|Vallejo
|style="text-align:right;"|0.8
|style="text-align:right;"|5.8
|
  Line 6: Poniente 128 station (at distance)
  Line 6: Poniente 134 station (at distance)

|-
|style="background: #; color: white;"|07
|Instituto del Petróleo
|style="text-align:right;"|1.0
|style="text-align:right;"|6.8
|
  Line 5
  Line 6: Instituto del Petróleo station (at distance)
 Routes: 23, 27-A, 103
  Line 1: Instituto del Petróleo stop (north–south route)
  Line 8: Montevideo stop (at distance)
|rowspan="5"|Gustavo A. Madero
|-
|style="background: #; color: white;"|08
|Lindavista 
| rowspan="4" |July 8, 1986
|style="text-align:right;"|1.4
|style="text-align:right;"|8.2
|
 Route: 104
|-
|style="background: #; color: white;"|09
|Deportivo 18 de Marzo 
|style="text-align:right;"|1.2
|style="text-align:right;"|9.4
|
  Line 3
 Deportivo 18 de Marzo
  Line 1: Deportivo 18 de Marzo station
  Line 6: Deportivo 18 de Marzo station
 Route: 15-B
|-
|style="background: #; color: white;"|10
|La Villa-Basílica
|style="text-align:right;"|0.7
|style="text-align:right;"|10.1
|
  Line 6: La Villa station (at distance)
  Line 7: Garrido station (at distance)
 Routes: 25, 101-A, 101-B, 101-D, 107-B
  Line 5: Garrido stop (at distance)
 Route: 15-B (at distance)
|-
|style="background: #; color: white;"|11
|Martín Carrera
|style="text-align:right;"|1.3
|style="text-align:right;"|11.4
|
  Line 4
 Martín Carrera
  Line 6: Martín Carrera station
 Routes: 33, 37
  Line 5: Martín Carrera stop
 Route: 5-A
|}

Renamed stations

Ridership
The following table shows each of Line 6 stations total and average daily ridership during 2019.

Tourism
Line 6 passes near several places of interest:

Mexico City Arena, indoor arena used to host concerts, sports, and other events.
Basilica of Our Lady of Guadalupe, basilica and national shrine of Mexico.

See also
 List of Mexico City Metro lines

Notes

References

1983 establishments in Mexico
6
Railway lines opened in 1983